Nirmala High School, Brahmavara is a Kannada medium high school in Brahmavar, Karnataka, India that was established in 1963.

History
Nirmala High School was started by the Sisters of Charity in 1963. The School officially opened on June 7, 1963. Earlier school was an all-girls school and later turned into a full-fledged high school for boys and girls.

Administration
Sr Elizabeth Fernandes is correspondent of the school and Mrs. Irene Menezes is additional headmistress of the school.

Golden Jubilee
The school celebrated its Golden Jubilee in 2013. The Golden jubilee function was held on Friday December 13, 2013.

References

High schools and secondary schools in Karnataka
Educational institutions established in 1963
1963 establishments in Mysore State
Schools in Udupi district